Temple Emanuel is a Reform synagogue located on the east side of Davenport, Iowa, United States.  Organized in 1861, it is the oldest Jewish congregation in Iowa. It is affiliated with the Union for Reform Judaism (UAHC).

In the 1830s, a dozen Jews were among the first residents of Davenport, and the synagogue was established after substantial numbers of Jews from Germany settled there in the 1850s. The congregation began with an Orthodox rabbi, but they soon embraced the Reform movement, as well as services in English rather than in German. In 2021, they entered into a sharing agreement with Congregation Beth Israel, and the two share a joint home called the Beit Shalom Jewish Community.

History

Among the first 500 residents of Davenport in the late 1830s and early 1840s were 12 people who were Jewish. There was no attempt to organize a congregation until more substantial numbers immigrated from Germany in the 1850s. Mount Nebo Cemetery, adjacent to Pine Hill Cemetery, was organized at that time. By 1860 there were eleven Jewish families in town. On October 21, 1861 they organized the B'nai Israel congregation, the first Jewish congregation to organize in the state of Iowa. In 1862 they rented the third floor of the building where the Forrest Block now stands for use as a synagogue. The constitutions and by-laws were accepted and approved on December 6, 1862. The congregation floundered somewhat in its early years until it was more fully organized in 1874.

Rabbi Isaac Fall, who was Orthodox, led the community for 15 years in the late 19th century. It was during this time that the congregation began to embrace the Reform movement. Women were accepted on an equal basis with men and men did not have to cover their heads during worship. Dissention was also caused when services were held in English rather than German. The congregation officially affiliated with the Union of American Hebrew Congregations (UAHC) in 1879, just six years after it formed. The first synagogue was built under Rabbi Fall's leadership in 1885 on Ripley Street, across the street from the Scott County Courthouse. It was named Temple Emanuel. The Orthodox formed their own congregation, B'nai Ameth, in 1894. They did not, however, have a regular rabbi until 1907 nor a synagogue of their own until 1909. With the death of its lay leader, Harry Lipsman, the Orthodox congregation closed in 1963. By 1900 there were about 50 Jewish families in Davenport.

A second Temple Emanuel was built at Brady and Eleventh Streets in 1906. Newspaper publisher E.P. Adler helped the congregation through the Great Depression years. In 1944 the city block at Twelfth Street and Mississippi Avenue was purchased by the congregation. The third synagogue was built from 1952-1953 for $375,000. ($ in present-day terms). New York City architect Percival Goodman, a leading theorist of modern synagogue design, designed the building in the Modern architectural style. In 2011 when they celebrated their 150th anniversary, Temple Emanuel counted 150 families in its congregation.

Beit Shalom Jewish Community
For more than 20 years, members from Temple Emanuel and the Conservative Congregation Beth Israel in Rock Island, Illinois discussed uniting as their numbers decreased. Beth Israel was founded in 1936 and incorporated two Orthodox congregations into theirs in 1950 and 1968. Over the years the two congregations shared schooling and holiday celebrations. In 2019, Beth Israel decided to sell their synagogue, the Tri-City Jewish Center, and approached Temple Emanuel with a proposal that the two congregations share space. That same year, property was acquired on East Kimberly Road in Davenport. The building was built in 1992 to house a restaurant and then was used by a local realtor for offices. It was renovated for religious purposes and named Beit Shalom Jewish Community. Elements from the older synagogues are incorporated into the new space, including two Tree's of Life from both congregations, three ner tamids, oversized doors and Ten Commandments from Tri-City Jewish Center, and stained glass windows and the Torah ark from Temple Emanuel. In early 2021, the two congregations "reached a sharing agreement in which they each will maintain their own identity, board of trustees and prayer books and services, but will share space and a rabbi." Members from both Temple Emanuel and Beth Israel walked from their former synagogues with their respective Torah scrolls to Beit Shalom on September 2, 2021. Together, the two congregations number 180 families.

The former Tri-City Jewish Center was sold to Two Rivers YMCA of Moline, Illinois. The  facility will be renovated into a combination Rock Island YMCA and a branch of the Rock Island Public Library. The Temple Emanuel building will be put up for sale.

References

External links
Synagogue website

Synagogues in Iowa
Religious buildings and structures in Davenport, Iowa
Reform synagogues in Iowa
German-American culture in Iowa
German-Jewish culture in the United States
Religious organizations established in 1861
1861 establishments in Iowa
Synagogues completed in 1953
Modernist architecture in Iowa
Percival Goodman synagogues